Hum Paanch may refer to:

 Hum Paanch (film), a 1980 Indian Hindi film
 Hum Paanch (TV series), a 1995-2006 Indian sitcom